Mohammed Shahout (born 2 May 1982) is a Libyan futsal player.

Shahout played for the Libya national futsal team at the 2008 FIFA Futsal World Cup.

Honors

National Team 
 African Futsal Championship:
 2008
 Arab Futsal Championship:
 2007, 2008

Individual 
 African Futsal Championship:
 Best Player: 2008

References

1982 births
Living people
Libyan men's futsal players